The Tuzancoa Formation is a geologic formation in Mexico. It preserves fossils dating back to the Permian period.

See also

 List of fossiliferous stratigraphic units in Mexico

References
 

Permian Mexico